Santé Mentale et Exclusion Sociale - Europa (SMES-Europa), or Mental Health and Social Exclusion - Europa (MHSE-Europa) is an international non-profit organization that helps people experiencing both mental illness and extreme poverty.  SMES-Europa, the Europe-wide organization, was founded in 1992.

History 
The European SMES project began in Rome as a result of the first European seminar on the appalling neglect and abandonment homeless people living in extremely poor health & social conditions. The poverty and social exclusion are not a fatality, but a dramatic structural phenomenon of our society and constitutes a political challenge for all the Europe.
Loneliness, sickness, mental illness, drug abuse and/or alcoholism, may be the cause or the results of this state of alienation and exclusion from society, which in some cases the same social context is responsible in beginning of the process that risk to become irreversible and which could eventually lead to a complete break with society.

General objectives 
 to improve mental, physical and social well-being; 
 to promote respect of Fundamental Human RIGHT and to facilitate the access to citizenship rights : housing, health, job, education;
 to promote active inclusion: participation and solidarity for people living in extreme social and health precariousness in all European Countries, especially for homeless and mentally ill people.

Specific objectives 
 Information and heightening of awareness for all civic society 
 Networking : improving opportunities of working together 
 Education and training: permanent and continuum, promoting exchanges 
 Lobbying and advocacy

Target group
SMES helps:
 mentally ill people without adequate assistance, 
 young people at risk of losing viable contact with society, 
 people addicted to alcohol and drugs, 
 ex/prisoners, 
 elderly people who have been abandoned, 
 refugees and migrants without permission of residence.

External links
http://www.smes-europa.org/

Mental health organizations
European medical and health organizations